Diego García-Sayán Larrabure (born August 2, 1950) is a Peruvian lawyer and former Foreign Affairs Minister of Perú. He sat as judge of the Inter-American Court of Human Rights, and was president of the Court between 2010 and 2012. He is the United Nations Special Rapporteur on the independence of judges and lawyers.

On August 15, 2014, the Peruvian Government formally   announced its launching of Dr. Garcia-Sayan's candidacy in the upcoming 2015 election for the post of Secretary-General of the Organization of American States (OAS), a decision which was rescinded unilaterally by the candidate himself on October 1, 2014, as a result of what he said was the said Government's lack of proper support towards that end.

Biography
García Sayán was born in Brooklyn, New York, the youngest son of Dr. Enrique García-Sayán, a former Foreign Affairs Minister of Perú who, in 1946, was associated, along with President José Luis Bustamante y Rivero, with launching the so-called "200 Nautical Miles (370.4 km) Territorial Doctrine", currently being adhered to and claimed  by  Benin, Congo, Ecuador, El Salvador, Liberia, Perú  and Somalia. After the 1948 coup d´état which overthrew the constitutionally elected Government of President Bustamante, Dr. García-Sayán went into exile,  working with the United Nations first in New York, then in Geneva,  which led a year later to  his son Diego's birth in the United States.

Professional and political activities 
García-Sayán co-founded the Peruvian Center for International Studies (CEPEI) in 1980. He subsequently founded the Andean Commission of Jurists (CAJ) in 1982 and served as executive director until 2000 except for a brief hiatus from 1992 to 1994. He is also a member of Washington D.C. based think tank the Inter-American Dialogue.

He also worked for the United Nations in many expert and senior positions. He has served as member of the United Nations Working Group on Enforced or Involuntary Disappearances from 1988 to 2004, including as chairperson of the mechanism. From 1991 to 1992 he joined the UN Negotiating Team appointed by Secretary General Boutros Boutros-Ghali to mediate into the Guatemalan Peace Process between the Government and the URNG. From 1992 to 1994 he worked as Director of the Human Rights Division within the UN Observer Mission in El Salvador (ONUSAL).

On 1995 he joined former United Nations Secretary General Javier Perez de Cuellar in his unsuccessful bid for the Presidency of the Republic of Peru against the incumbent candidate President Alberto Fujimori, and won a seat in the Congress. under the banner of the political party "Union por el Peru". Following the political collapse of the Fujimori's regime a Transitional Government was formed and Garcia-Sayan was called by President Valentin Paniagua to serve as  Minister of Justice from 2000 to 2001. Newly elected President Alejandro Toledo appointed Garcia-Sayan as Minister of Foreign Affairs, holding the post from 2001 to 2002.

The 33rd period of General Assembly of the Organization of American States held in Santiago de Chile in 2003 elected Garcia-Sayan to serve a six-years term as Justice of the Inter-American Court of Human Rights starting in 2004 and he served as the Court's vice-president for the 2008–09 period. Re-elected for a second mandate, he served as President of the Court for the 2010-12 period.

On 27 January 2017, United Nations Secretary-General António Guterres designated him a member of the Selection Mechanism for the Special Jurisdiction of Peace, established in Colombia in 2016.
  
Also, since January 2017 he is Special Rapporteur on the Independence of Judges and Lawyers for the United Nations. He is also currently serving as an advisory board member of the Global Judicial Integrity Network at the United Nations Office on Drugs and Crime (UNODC).

Education 
García Sayán attended the "Santa Maria" School, graduating from high-school in 1967. He then attended the Pontifical Catholic University of Peru in Lima, graduating with a bachelor's degree in 1969. He continued his studies at the University of Texas,  at Austin in 1970, and returned to the Pontifical Catholic University of Peru for his law degree in 1975, where he has, since then, also taught law.

On his spare time, Mr. García Sayán is a percussionist and motorcycle enthusiast, the former from his times as a teenager, when he and several of his school friends as well as  others from other schools, formed the rock group Los Hang Ten's.

References

External links 

1950 births
Living people
Foreign ministers of Peru
Inter-American Court of Human Rights judges
Members of the Inter-American Dialogue
20th-century Peruvian lawyers
21st-century Peruvian judges
Peruvian judges of international courts and tribunals
Peruvian Ministers of Justice
Peruvian people of Spanish descent